Biological material may refer to:

Natural materials
 Organic matter, matter that has come from a once-living organism, or is composed of organic compounds
 A chemical substance present or produced in a living organism
 Biomolecule, a molecule present in a living organism
 Biogenic substance, a chemical substance produced by a living organism
 Biotic material, natural material, or natural product, a material produced by a living organism
 Biomass, living or dead biological matter, often plants grown as fuel
 Biomass (ecology), the total mass of living matter in a given environment, or of a given species
 Body fluid, any liquid originating from inside the bodies of living people
 Cellular component, material and substances of which cells (and thus living organisms) are composed
 Tissue (biology), a cellular organizational level intermediate between cells and a complete organ
 Viable material, capable of living, developing, or germinating under favorable conditions (see Viability selection)

Human-made materials
 Bio-based material, a processed biotic material
 Biocomposite, a composite material formed by a matrix (resin) and a reinforcement of natural fibers
 Biomaterial, any substance that has been engineered to interact with biological systems for a medical purpose